This is a list of Sam Houston Bearkats football players in the NFL Draft.

Key

Selections

References

Sam Houston

Sam Houston Bearkats NFL Draft